The Vladimir Ilich Lenin Higher Party School was a university-level education institution that existed in Albania during the period of Communist rule. It was founded on August 11, 1945 and closed in 1991. The school was accessible to all who had finished high school education. Many of the students were already graduates in other fields in other institutions of higher education in Albania. In addition to a high school education, the other criterion for admission was loyalty to the Party. The studies lasted two years, without having to face exams or other academic testing, nor a final thesis or exam whatsoever. All the classes were about Marxist-Leninist theory, Communist Party history and similar.

The last Director (Rector, Chancellor) of the School was Nexhmije Hoxha, the widow of Enver Hoxha, the dictator of Albania from 1944 until 1985, his death. Nexhmije herself was without a formal higher education, because there were no universities in Albania until the communist period. Previous directors included Fiqrete Shehu, the wife of long-time prime minister Mehmet Shehu.

Students were given a two-year scholarship (the duration of the studies) of 800 Albanian lek per month. This was twice the salary of a factory worker and thrice the salary of a peasant worker. For the duration of their studies, the students were given free student housing for themselves and family.

See also
List of universities in Albania

References

1945 establishments in Albania
1991 disestablishments in Albania
Communism in Albania
Education in Tirana
Educational institutions established in 1945
Educational institutions disestablished in 1991
Universities in Albania